Waubonsie Valley High School (WVHS) is a public four-year high school in Aurora, Illinois, United States. It was established in 1975 and it is one of 3 high schools in Indian Prairie School District 204, along with Neuqua Valley High School and Metea Valley High School.

History 
Indian Prairie Community Unit School District #204 (a unit district K-12) was formed in the fall of 1972. In December 1972 a referendum was passed to build and equip a high school at a projected cost of $8.2 million. A separate issue also passed to add a swimming pool. Construction on Waubonsie Valley High School began in the spring of 1973.

In September 1975, Waubonsie Valley opened its doors for its first school year. 293 Freshmen, Sophomores and Juniors attended the new high school. In addition, 7th and 8th graders were housed in the building (using the name Granger Junior High) until Hill Junior High (now Hill Middle School) opened in the Fall of 1981. Construction delays prevented students from using the gym until May 1976 and the pool until October 1976.

The school was designed as an open campus, with very few walls to separate classes. This quickly gave way to temporary room dividers and eventually, more permanent walls. Major construction projects over the years added three classroom wings, a field house and an auditorium, leaving just a few clues as to the original design of the building. The school was considered futuristic with a swimming pool, greenhouse, and planetarium.

Demographics
In 2021, 41.9% of the student body identified as White, 23.3% of the student body identified as Asian, 18.3% of the student body identified as Hispanic, 10.7% of the student body identified as Black, and 5.7% of the student body identified as another race.

Music program 
The Waubonsie Valley music program has received a Grammy Award six times in total. WVHS was named a Grammy Association's Signature School in 1999, 2003, 2004, 2005, 2006, and 2011 through the National Academy of Recording Arts and Sciences. In 2007 and 2011, WVHS was one of two schools in the nation to receive the honor of the Grammy Association's Signature GOLD School.

The choir program offers seven choirs and several extracurricular ensembles, including two show choirs. The top level mixed show choir was ranked 1st for 2009, 2011, 2013, 2014, and 2015 by the National Show Choir Ranking System.

Notable alumni 
 Derek Ahonen (1999), playwright, director, and founder of the Amoralists Theatre Company in New York City.
 Patrick Beverley, professional basketball player
 Michael Bowden (2005), former professional baseball player, Boston Red Sox, 
 Fabien Bownes, NFL wide receiver and kickoff returner for the Chicago Bears (1995, 1997-1998) and Seattle Seahawks (1999-2001).
Michael Damian Thomas (1992) - Hugo Award-winning science fiction editor and podcaster, publisher of Uncanny Magazine
Parvesh Cheena (1997), actor known for role as Gupta in the NBC series, Outsourced. He has also appeared in the TV shows ER, Sons of Tucson, The Suite Life of Zack & Cody, along with many more. He was also in the two movies in the Barbershop series.
 Steve Keller, retired soccer midfielder
 Chris Schuler (2009), professional soccer player
 Peter Tiberio, USA Eagles rugby player
 Morolake Akinosun (2012), gold medal winner of the women's 4 × 100 metres relay in the 2016 Rio Olympics
 Troy Fumagalli (2013), current tight end for NFL's Denver Broncos
 Jerry Harris (2017), cheerleader from Cheer

Notable staff 
 Dan Schatzeder (physical education teacher) was a Major League Baseball pitcher (1977—91).  He was a member of the 1987 World Series Champion Minnesota Twins.
 Angelo DiBernardo (Spanish teacher) is a retired soccer player who played professionally in the North American Soccer League and Major Indoor Soccer League. He also represented the United States at the 1984 Summer Olympics. DiBernardo played alongside soccer legend Pelé during his time at New York Cosmos.

References

External links 
 

Education in Aurora, Illinois
Schools in DuPage County, Illinois
Public high schools in Illinois
Educational institutions established in 1975
1975 establishments in Illinois